Zone 6 may refer to:

Travelcard Zone 6, of the Transport for London zonal system
Hardiness zone, a geographically defined zone in which a specific category of plant life is capable of growing
Zone 6 of Milan, one of the 9 administrative zones of Milan, Italy